White Spot is a Canadian restaurant chain.

White spot may also refer to:

Disease
Ichthyophthirius multifiliis, freshwater fish parasite, the disease it causes is often called white spot
Cryptocaryon irritans, marine fish parasite, also referred to as white spot
White spot syndrome a viral infection of penaeid shrimp

Animals
Aplocheilus panchax, the whitespot, a common freshwater fish, native to South and Southeast Asia
Hadena albimacula, the white spot, a European moth
Hypagyrtis unipunctata, the one-spotted variant moth or white spot, an American and Eurasian moth

Other uses
Great White Spot, periodic storms on the surface of Saturn, visible by telescope from Earth
Stachys sylvatica, a plant native to Europe and Asia

Animal common name disambiguation pages